Vegaea is a genus of flowering plants belonging to the family Primulaceae.

Its native range is Dominican Republic.

Species:
 Vegaea pungens Urb.

References

Primulaceae
Primulaceae genera